Portland is a city in Nueces and San Patricio Counties in the U.S. state of Texas.  Its population was 20,383 as of the 2020 United States census. Portland is a suburb of Corpus Christi, located on the north shore of Nueces and Corpus Christi Bays.

Geography

Portland is located at  (27.883117, –97.320466). According to the United States Census Bureau, the city has a total area of 9.6 sq mi (24.9 km), of which 7.0 sq mi (18.1 km) are land and 2.6 sq mi (6.8 km) (27.44%) are covered by water.
The city is roughly equidistant from Portland, Maine, and Portland, Oregon. In 2014 and 2015, the city annexed an additional 1.27 sq mi, bringing the total area to 10.87 sq mi.

Demographics

2020 census

As of the 2020 United States census, there were 20,383 people, 6,136 households, and 4,639 families residing in the city.

2000 census
As of the census of 2000,  14,827 people, 5,021 households, and 4,051 families were residing in the city. The population density was 2,125.5 people/sq mi (820.2/km). The 5,351 housing units averaged 767.1sq mi (296.0/km).

In 2017, the Texas Demographic Center estimated the population at 21,619.

Of the 5,021 households,  47.5% had children under the age of 18 living with them, 68.6% were married couples living together, 9.2% had a female householder with no husband present, and 19.3% were not families. About 16.1% of all households were made up of individuals, and 6.1% had someone living alone who was 65 years of age or older. The average household size was 2.94, and the average family size was 3.30.

In the city, the age distribution was 32.6% under 18, 8.2% from 18 to 24, 31.2% from 25 to 44, 20.0% from 45 to 64, and 7.9% who were 65 or older. The median age was 32 years. For every 100 females, there were 98.1 males. For every 100 females age 18 and over, there were 93.1 males.
The median income for a household in the city was $48,574, and for a family was $52,220. Males had a median income of $37,316 versus $25,722 for females. The per capita income for the city was $19,871. About 5.8% of families and 7.4% of the population were below the poverty line, including 9.3% of those under age 18 and 10.2% of those age 65 or over.

History

The original 640-acre townsite of Portland was purchased by John G. Willacy in 1890. In 1891, Willacy sold the land to the Portland (Maine) Harbor and Improvement Co.  Portland is situated on the second-highest bluff on the Gulf Coast, and overlooks both Nueces and Corpus Christi Bays.

Education

Portland's public education is provided by Gregory-Portland Independent School District, made up of W. C. Andrews Elementary (grades K–5), T. M. Clark Elementary, East Cliff Elementary, Stephen F. Austin Elementary (in Gregory), Gregory-Portland Middle School (grade 6–8),and Gregory-Portland High (grades 9–12) Schools.

Crime
In 2010, Portland had a crime index lower than the U.S. average and half that of Texas.

Notable people

 Mitch Morris, an American actor and attorney, was a  regular in Queer as Folk (U.S. TV series) and star in the sex comedy, Another Gay Movie
 Vince Vieluf, an American actor; starred in An American Werewolf in Paris, Rat Race,  Love, Inc.,  National Lampoon's Barely Legal, and cult favorite Grind
 Don Williams (1939–2017), was a country singer and songwriter. Williams moved to Portland as a child from the Texas Panhandle/South Plains town of Floydada, and was a 1958 graduate of Gregory-Portland High School. Williams had 17 songs to reach number one on the country charts
Steve Trevino, Comedian

References

Further reading

External links

 Portland official website
 Portland Chamber of Commerce

Cities in Nueces County, Texas
Cities in San Patricio County, Texas
Cities in Texas
Cities in the Corpus Christi metropolitan area
Populated coastal places in Texas